Selorio (variant: Santa Eulalia de Selorio) is one of 41 parishes (administrative divisions) in Villaviciosa, a municipality within the province and autonomous community of Asturias, in northern Spain.

Villages and hamlets
 Barzana
 La Busta
 La Cai
 Misiegu
 Olivar
 La Rasa
 El Terienzu
 Vega
 Villar
 Santa Mera

References

Parishes in Villaviciosa